The 2004 CONCACAF Women's Pre-Olympic Tournament was the first edition of the CONCACAF Women's Pre-Olympic Tournament, the quadrennial international football tournament organised by CONCACAF to determine which women's national teams from the North, Central American and Caribbean region qualify for the Olympic football tournament. The tournament was held in Costa Rica from 25 February to 5 March 2004.

The tournament was originally scheduled to be held in Mexico from 2 to 12 February 2004, but was later moved to Costa Rica.

The top two teams qualified for the 2004 Summer Olympics women's football tournament in Greece as the CONCACAF representatives. The United States won the final 3–2 against Mexico, with both teams qualifying for the Olympics.

Qualification

Canada, Costa Rica and the United States automatically qualified for the final tournament. The remaining five berths were allocated to the five group winners of the qualification tournament.

Qualified teams
The following eight teams qualified for the final tournament. Mexico, the original hosts of the tournament, originally qualified automatically. However, after the tournament venue was changed, new hosts Costa Rica instead qualified automatically, while Mexico took Costa Rica's place in the qualifying competition.

Venues
The matches were held at the Estadio Nacional, San José and the Estadio Eladio Rosabal Cordero, Heredia.

Squads

Group stage
The top two teams from each group advanced to the semi-finals.

All times are local, CST (UTC−6).

Tiebreakers
The ranking of teams in the group stage was determined as follows:

 Points obtained in all group matches (three points for a win, one for a draw, none for a defeat);
 Goal difference in all group matches;
 Number of goals scored in all group matches;
 Points obtained in the matches played between the teams in question;
 Goal difference in the matches played between the teams in question;
 Number of goals scored in the matches played between the teams in question;
 Play-off on neutral ground.

Group A

Group B

Knockout stage

Bracket

Semi-finals
The semi-final winners qualified for the 2004 Summer Olympics.

Third place play-off

Final

Goalscorers

Best XI
The following players were included in CONCACAF's "Best XI" of the tournament.

Qualified teams for Summer Olympics
The following two teams from CONCACAF qualified for the 2004 Summer Olympic women's football tournament.

1 Bold indicates champions for that year. Italic indicates hosts for that year.

References

 
2004
Olympic Qualifying Championship, Women's
Football qualification for the 2004 Summer Olympics
2004 in women's association football
Olympic Qualifying, Women's
2004 Concacaf Women's Pre-Olympic Tournament
February 2004 sports events in North America
March 2004 sports events in North America